Patrick Stettner is an American film director and writer. His first film, Flux, was released in 1996 as a short, and starred Allison Janney in an early role. He went on to direct and write the screenplay for The Business of Strangers in 2001, which earned him a Grand Jury Prize nomination at the Sundance Film Festival of that year and earned lead actress Stockard Channing an AFI nomination for Best Female Actress. In 2006, he then wrote and directed The Night Listener, an adaptation of Armistead Maupin's eponymous semi-autobiographical 2000 novel, which landed less-than-stellar reviews from critics. He has not directed any films since The Night Listener.

He is an alumnus of Columbia University School of the Arts' film division.

Awards and nominations

References

External links
 

Living people
American film directors
Columbia University School of the Arts alumni
Year of birth missing (living people)